El Moro Canyon orthohantavirus is a single-stranded, negative sense RNA virus of the genus Orthohantavirus. It is a causative agent of Hantavirus pulmonary syndrome.

Natural reservoir 
El Moro Canyon virus was isolated from western harvest mice (Reithrodontomys megalotis), in El Moro Canyon in southeastern Colorado in 1995.

Carrizal virus and Huitzilac virus, two additional strains, were first identified in Mexican wild rodents located in Morelos and Guerrero, Mexico.

References 

Viral diseases
Hantaviridae
Rodent-carried diseases